Josh Hinger (born May 28, 1982) is an American submission grappler and Brazilian jiu-jitsu (BJJ) black belt competitor as well as former mixed martial arts (MMA) fighter. Hinger is three-time champion at the World No-Gi Brazilian Jiu-Jitsu Championship and a Bronze Medalist at the ADCC Submission Wrestling World Championship.

Background 

Hinger was born on May 28, 1982, in Whittier, California, USA and was raised in La Habra where he wrestled for Sonora High School. At age 15, he moved to Temecula and continued to wrestle for Chaparral High School where during his senior year in 2000, he was champion in a regional California Interscholastic Federation tournament in the 145 lbs division. However after winning the regional tournament, he was weight cutting for the Masters tournament and noticed he wasn't losing any further weight. Ultimately he decided to withdraw from the tournament which resulted in backlash from his coach and team and lead to him being kicked off the team permanently.

After high school, Hinger attended UC Irvine and in 2003 while attending school, an old wrestling teammate brought him to check out a BJJ academy which started his journey into BJJ. Hinger would become part of Chris Brennan's fight team in Lake Forest. Brennan was Hinger's first BJJ coach and raised him from white belt to purple belt. Brennan would also act as Hinger's MMA coach.

In November 2003, Hinger made his MMA debut where he submitted Brady Fulton via rear naked choke in the first round. His MMA career lasted from 2003 to 2005 where he compiled a record on the regional circuit of four wins and one loss. Brennan's fight team came to an end in 2006 due to personal issues in the training room and disagreement among team leaders.

In 2006, after graduating from UC Irvine, Hinger joined the Peace Corps and spent two years in Turkmenistan where he participated in a few wrestling tournaments.

In 2008, Hinger came back to the US and moved to Orange County where he trained with Baret Yoshida and Jason Bukich to earn his Brown Belt. 

From 2011 to 2014, Hinger attended graduate school at Indiana University Bloomington earning degrees in Central Eurasian Studies and Public Affairs with a focus in Finance. While at university, Hinger taught BJJ to attendees. During this period Hinger joined Atos Jiu-Jitsu where he trained under André Galvão. In December 2013, Hinger earned his Black Belt under Galvão.

Hinger was BJJ trainer and cornerman of UFC Woman's Strawweight Champion, Zhang Weilli in 2022 and helped her regain her belt at UFC 281 where she defeated Carla Esparza by rear naked choke.

Professional grappling career
Hinger is a three-time IBJJF no gi World Champion, winning the event in 2016, 2017, and 2018. He won ADCC trials in 2019 to earn a place at the 2019 ADCC World Championships, where he won a bronze medal.

In December 2020, Hinger won a gold medal in both his weightclass and the absolute division at the IBJJF Masters World Championships.

Hinger competed in the main event of Fight 2 Win 170 on April 19, 2021, facing Rafael Barbosa for the promotion's Masters Middleweight title. Hinger won the match by decision. He then competed against Vagner Rocha at Who's Number One on May 28, 2021 and he lost the match by decision. He returned to Fight 2 Win on September 10, 2021 to face Corey Guitard at Fight 2 Win 183, winning the match by decision.

At BJJ Stars 7 on November 6, 2021, Hinger defeated Luis Marques on points in the co-main event. Hinger was then invited to compete in the first RAW Grappling Championship grand prix on November 14, 2021. He defeated Bradley Hill in the opening round before losing to Patrick Gaudio in the semi-final.

As a result of being a previous medallist, Hinger was invited to compete at the 2022 ADCC World Championship in the 88kg division. Hinger defeated Tye Ruotolo in the opening round before losing to eventual silver medallist Lucas 'Hulk' Barbosa.

On September 24, 2023 Hinger competed against Owen Livesey at Polaris 21. He lost by split decision.

Competitive grappling summary 

Main Achievements:

 IBJJF World No-Gi Champion (2016, 2017 and 2018)
 3rd place ADCC World Championship (2019)
 2nd place Eddie Bravo Invitational 3 (2015)

Mixed martial arts record 

|-
| Loss
| align=center| 4–1
| Johnny Sampaio
| Decision (Unanimous)
| Extreme Wars – X-1
| 
| align=center| 3
| align=center| 5:00
| Hawaii, United States
| 
|-
| Win
| align=center| 4–0
| Chris Monso
| Submission (Keylock)
| KOTC 49 – Soboba
| 
| align=center| 1
| align=center| 2:58
| San Jacinto, California, United States
| 
|-
| Win
| align=center| 3–0
| Frank Sanchez
| Submission (Rear Naked Choke)
| XCF 4 – Havoc in Havasu 2
| 
| align=center| 1
| align=center| N/A
| Arizona, United States
| 
|-
| Win
| align=center| 2–0
| Tim Carey
| Submission (Armbar)
| OTE – Over the Edge
| 
| align=center| 1
| align=center| 4:51
| Arizona, United States
| 
|-
| Win
| align=center| 1–0
| Brady Fulton
| Submission (Rear Naked Choke)
| XCF 3 – Xtreme Cage Fighter 3
| 
| align=center| 1
| align=center| 2:00
| Arizona, United States
|

Instructor lineage 
Mitsuyo "Count Koma" Maeda → Carlos Gracie, Sr. → Helio Gracie → Rolls Gracie → Romero "Jacare" Cavalcanti → Alexandre Paiva → Fernando "Tererê" Augusto →  André Galvao →  Josh Hinger

External links

See also 
List of Brazilian Jiu-Jitsu practitioners

References 

Living people
1982 births
American male mixed martial artists
American practitioners of Brazilian jiu-jitsu
Indiana University alumni
Lightweight mixed martial artists
Mixed martial artists utilizing Brazilian jiu-jitsu
People awarded a black belt in Brazilian jiu-jitsu
People from Whittier, California
University of California, Irvine alumni
World No-Gi Brazilian Jiu-Jitsu Championship medalists